Mattson, also known as Earnest, is an unincorporated community located near U.S. Route 49 in Coahoma County, Mississippi, United States.

History
Mattson is named after a local family that owned a large sawmill in the area. Mattson is located at a junction of the former Yazoo and Mississippi Valley Railroad. A post office operated under the name Earnest from 1887 to 1897 and first began operation under the name Mattson in 1897. A drug store operated by T. R. Montgomery formerly operated in Mattson.

Notable people
 Big George Brock, blues harmonica player
 Clayton Love, blues pianist, bandleader, singer

References

Unincorporated communities in Coahoma County, Mississippi
Unincorporated communities in Mississippi